The Hungarian Solidarity Movement (SOLIDARITY) (SZOLIDARITÁS) is an independent political movement in Hungary, which was founded in 2011, against the Cabinet of Orbán. The movement's leader is Péter Kónya.

History

The solidarity founded on 1 October 2011 to 10 individuals, led by Kornel Trench, Tamas Szekely, Peter Sandor Konya and Szekely, who is the Armed Forces and Police Workers Advocacy Association (FRDÉSZ) was previously chairman of the trade union. On 17 December 2012, during a demonstration series was announced to become a national organization. On December 23, 2011 was called to life is the dean (Democratic Opposition Round Table) to the democratic opposition parties to facilitate cooperation. On October 26, 2012, she joined the formation of the Solidarity Movement in 2014.

The 2014 parliamentary elections, the three together parliamentary representatives of the two members of the Solidarity Movement. Peter Konya list, dr. Szabolcs Szabo and Csepel Soroksar individual Member of Parliament came as the parliament.

On 6 September 2014, the General Assembly of Solidarity transformed the organization's management structure, Alexander Szekely elected executive president, Peter Konya and social chairman.

See also
 Politics of Hungary
 Together 2014
 Solidarity (Polish trade union)
 Solidarnost

References

Opposition to Viktor Orbán
Political opposition organizations
Political organisations based in Hungary